Agramunt is a municipality (municipi) in the comarca of the Urgell in Catalonia. It is situated in the north of the comarca, near the border with the Noguera. The town centre is protected as a historic-artistic monument, especially the Roman church of Santa Maria which dates from the 12th-13th centuries. The town is also known for the production of torró d'Agramunt, a sort of confectionery traditionally eaten at Christmas. The town is linked to Tàrrega by the C-240 road, to Cervera by the L-303 road and to Artesa de Segre by the L-302 road. The Urgell canal passes through the municipality, crossing the Montclar range through a tunnel. The municipality includes the exclave of Montclar d'Urgell to the north-west.

Demography

References

 Panareda Clopés, Josep Maria; Rios Calvet, Jaume; Rabella Vives, Josep Maria (1989). Guia de Catalunya, Barcelona: Caixa de Catalunya.  (Spanish).  (Catalan).

External links

Official website 
 Government data pages 

Municipalities in Urgell
Populated places in Urgell